Köln Volkhovener Weg is a railway station situated at Chorweiler, Cologne in western Germany. It is served by the S11 line of the Rhine-Ruhr S-Bahn.

Notes 

S11 (Rhine-Ruhr S-Bahn)
Railway stations in Cologne
Rhine-Ruhr S-Bahn stations
Railway stations in Germany opened in 1975
Chorweiler